Bullet is a Malayalam language film directed by Nizar and produced by Nazim Vellila under the banner of Malayil Movie International. It was released in 2008. The film received negative reviews.

Cast

References

External links
 
 Watch it on Gigaplex

2008 films
2000s Malayalam-language films